Caring is a settlement  south of Bearsted, near the town of Maidstone in Kent, England. It is located amid several farms on the River Len, a tributary of the Medway. The population of the settlement is included in the Thurnham civil parish.

Caring Wood is a private family home designed by architects James Macdonald Wright and Niall Maxwell. In 2017 the house won an RIBA National Award and the RIBA House of the Year.

References

Villages in Kent